This is a list of districts in the London Borough of Haringey.

The whole borough is covered by the N postcode area.

Neighbourhoods

Electoral wards
Alexandra, Bounds Green, Bruce Grove, Crouch End, Fortis Green, Harringay, Highgate, Hornsey, Muswell Hill, Noel Park, Northumberland Park, St Ann's, Seven Sisters, Stroud Green, Tottenham Green, Tottenham, West Green, White Hart Lane, Woodside.

Lists of places in London